Nisaetus (Crested hawk-eagles group) is a genus of subfamily Aquilinae found mainly in tropical Asia. They were earlier placed within the genus Spizaetus but molecular studies show that the Old World representatives were closer to the genus Ictinaetus than to the New World Spizaetus (in the stricter sense). They are slender-bodied, medium-sized hawk-eagles with rounded wings, long feathered legs, barred wings, crests and usually adapted to forest habitats.

Taxonomy and species 
These Old World species were formerly placed in the genus Spizaetus. They were moved to the resurrected genus Nisaetus based on the results of molecular genetic studies published in 2005 and 2007. The genus Nisaetus had been introduced in 1836 by the English naturalist Brian Houghton Hodgson with the mountain hawk-eagle as the type species. The genus name Nisaetus combines the Medieval Latin nisus for a sparrowhawk with the Ancient Greek aetos meaning "eagle". The genus contains ten species.

References